Rosalina Berazaín Iturralde (born 21 February 1947, Havana) is a Cuban botanist, plant collector, plant taxonomist, and professor at the University of Havana.  She is one of the founders of the National Botanic Garden of Cuba, and a member of the Cuban Academy of Sciences.   The species Coccoloba berazainae and Coccoloba berazainiae were named in her honor.

References 

 1947 births
 Cuban women scientists
 Cuban botanists
Women botanists
20th-century botanists
20th-century women scientists
21st-century botanists
21st-century women scientists
People from Havana
Academic staff of University of Havana
Living people